Naseeb is a 1997 Indian Hindi romantic drama film directed by Kirti Kumar and produced by Vinay Kumar Sinha. It stars Govinda, Mamta Kulkarni and Rahul Roy in lead roles while Ajit Vachani, Shakti kapoor, Kader Khan appear in supporting roles. The movie was a Disaster at the box office but songs of the film became huge hits especially "Shikwa Nahin Kisi Se" song remains popular till today. Govinda's performance was also well received by audience and critics and is considered to be one of his finest performances.

Plot
The film starts with an inebriated Krishna Prasad (Govinda) who is attempting to commit suicide, but is interrupted by Master Chaban (Kader Khan) who stops him. Krishna befriends Chaban and helps him with his business. Deepak Bajaj (Rahul Roy) comes in for a job interview with Krishna's company and is hired.

One day Deepak's car has a problem, and Krishna takes him to his home where he sees Pooja (Mamta Kulkarni), wife of Deepak. In a flashback it is revealed that Krishna is a car mechanic and Pooja is going to a party with her friends. Her car has a problem and Krishna fixes it. Pooja then takes Krishna home. The two keep in touch, and eventually fall in love. Pooja's father, Din Dayal (Ajit Vachhani), meets Krishna and offers him money so he can open his factory. However, Krishna refuses, and decides that he will only marry Pooja when he has become a successful businessman. During this time he writes to Pooja telling her to forget him. Pooja is heartbroken. When Krishna returns, he is also heartbroken to see Pooja has married another man. On Krishna's birthday, Deepak and Pooja are invited to his party. Pooja is surprised to see Krishna's mansion, since it has every feature that she wanted and she had told to Krishna. Deepak and Pooja meet Krishna, and while everyone is dancing Krishna tries to kiss Pooja. This enrages Deepak who slaps Krishna. Krishna then apologizes to Pooja. Deepak insults Krishna, who gets enraged and fights with Deepak and gets him arrested on charges of embezzling money.

Deepak's father begs Krishna to release Deepak, but Krishna tells him that he wants Pooja in return. This infuriates Deepak's father. Pooja thinks that Krishna wants to sleep with her, but Krishna slaps her and tells her that he only loves her and he did all this just so that she can understand his feelings.

Krishna releases Deepak who kicks Pooja out of his house. Master Chaban then takes her to his house. Chaban goes to Dharamdas and learns that he burnt the second letter. Chaban goes to Krishna, who takes Pooja to Deepak and tells him how much Pooja loves Deepak, but Deepak rejects the story. Krishna commits suicide by shooting himself and dies in the arms of Deepak and Pooja.

Cast
Govinda as Krishna Prasad
Rahul Roy as Deepak Bajaj 
Mamta Kulkarni as Pooja Dayal
Ajit Vachani as Din Dayal
Beena Banerjee as Mrs. Din Dayal
Shakti Kapoor as Lalli
Dinesh tiloo as Lallis' friend
Kader Khan as Master Chaban
Saeed Jaffrey as Dharamdas Bajaj
Sudha Chandran

Soundtrack
The film was average in terms of collection, however, its soundtrack was very popular. The Lyrics was written by Sameer and Music composed by Nadeem-Shravan.

And songs sang by Kumar Sanu, Udit Narayan, Alka Yagnik, Anuradha Paudwal, Kavita Krishnamurthy and Babul Supriyo.

External links

References

1990s Hindi-language films
1998 films
Films scored by Nadeem–Shravan